Automation Anywhere is an American global software company that develops robotic process automation (RPA) software.

Founded in 2003, the company is headquartered in San Jose, California.

History 
Automation Anywhere was originally founded as Tethys Solutions, LLC in San Jose,  by Mihir Shukla, Neeti Mehta Shukla, Ankur Kothari and Rushabh Parmani.  The company rebranded itself as Automation Anywhere, Inc. in 2010.

As of early 2021, the company reported some 2,800 client firms around the world.  Customers cited in 2020 included Volkswagen, Whirlpool, and other organizations.

The company's 2,100+ partner relationships  include collaborations with Microsoft, Google, and Amazon Web Services to advance intelligent automation, and with Salesforce, to help its customers automate their front office business processes. In early 2021, the company had 110+ customers who are also partners.

Between 2018 and 2019, Automation Anywhere received a total of $840 million in Series A and Series B investments at a post-money valuation of $6.9 billion. In 2018 the company announced a total of Series A investments of $550 million from General Atlantic, Goldman Sachs, NEA, World Innovation Lab, SoftBank Investment Advisers, and Workday Ventures. In late 2019, a Series B round, led by Salesforce Ventures, raised $290 million.

In 2019, the company acquired Klevops, a privately owned company based in Paris that works in the finance, banking and telecommunications industries.

In December 2021, Automation Anywhere announced it intends to acquire process discovery startup FortressIQ.

Automation Anywhere's co-founder, Neeti Mehta Shukla, received the Women's Entrepreneurship Day Organization’s Technology Pioneer Award at the United Nations in 2022, celebrating her as a trailblazer and innovator in her field. The prestigious award, also recognized by the US Congress, highlights women entrepreneurs and the meaningful impact they are having on the world.

References

External links 

 

Software testing tools
Automation software
Software companies based in California
Web scraping
Software companies of the United States
2003 establishments in the United States
2003 establishments in California
Software companies established in 2003
Companies established in 2003